The handball tournaments at the 2013 Mediterranean Games in Mersin took place between 22 June and 30 June. The men's tournament was held at the Lütfullah Aksungur Sports Hall, while the women's tournament was held at the Yüreğir Serinevler Arena. Both handball venues are in Adana.

Medal table

Medal summary

Events

Participating nations
Following nations have applied to compete in handball tournaments. At least six nations competing is the requirement for tournaments to be held. None of the Asian nations opted to compete in any of the tournaments.

Men

Women

References

 
Sports at the 2013 Mediterranean Games
2013
Mediterranean Games
International handball competitions hosted by Turkey